Lead(II) sulfate (PbSO4) is a white solid, which appears white in microcrystalline form. It is also known as fast white, milk white, sulfuric acid lead salt or anglesite.

It is often seen in the plates/electrodes of car batteries, as it is formed when the battery is discharged (when the battery is recharged, then the lead sulfate is transformed back to metallic lead and sulfuric acid on the negative terminal or lead dioxide and sulfuric acid on the positive terminal). Lead sulfate is poorly soluble in water.

Structure
Anglesite (lead(II) sulfate) adopts the same orthorhombic crystal structure as celestite (strontium sulfate) and barite (barium sulfate). All three minerals' structures are in the space group Pbnm (number 62). Each lead(II) ion is surrounded by 12 oxygen atoms from 7 sulfate ions, forming a PbO12 polyhedron. The lead–oxygen distances range from 2.612 Å to 3.267 Å and the average distance is 2.865 Å.

Manufacturing
Lead(II) sulfate is prepared by treating lead oxide, hydroxide or carbonate with warm sulfuric acid or by treating a soluble lead salt with sulfuric acid.

Alternatively, it can be made by the interaction of solutions of lead nitrate and sodium sulfate.

Toxicology
Lead sulfate is toxic by inhalation, ingestion and skin contact. It is a cumulative poison, and repeated exposure may lead to anemia, kidney damage, eyesight damage or damage to the central nervous system (especially in children). It is also corrosive - contact with the eyes can lead to severe irritation or burns. Typical threshold limit value is 0.15 mg/m3.

Mineral
The naturally occurring mineral anglesite, PbSO4, occurs as an oxidation product of primary lead sulfide ore,

Basic and hydrogen lead sulfates
A number of lead basic sulfates are known: PbSO4·PbO; PbSO4·2PbO; PbSO4·3PbO; PbSO4·4PbO. They are used in manufacturing of active paste for lead–acid batteries. A related mineral is leadhillite, 2PbCO3·PbSO4·Pb(OH)2.

At high concentration of sulfuric acid (>80%), lead hydrogensulfate, Pb(HSO4)2, forms.

Chemical properties
Lead(II) sulfate can be dissolved in concentrated HNO3, HCl, H2SO4 producing acidic salts or complex compounds, and in concentrated alkali giving soluble tetrahydroxidoplumbate(II) [Pb(OH)4]2− complexes.

 PbSO4 + H2SO4  Pb(HSO4)2

 PbSO4 + 4NaOH → Na2[Pb(OH)4] + Na2SO4

Lead(II) sulfate decomposes when heated above 1000 °C:
 PbSO4 → PbO + SO3

Applications 

 Lead-acid storage batteries
 Paint pigments
 Laboratory reagent

See also 

 Lead paint

References

External links

 Case Studies in Environmental Medicine (CSEM): Lead Toxicity
 ToxFAQs: Lead
 National Pollutant Inventory - Lead and Lead Compounds Fact Sheet

Sulfates
Lead(II) compounds